Frank Henderson (1 June 1908 – 6 December 1954) was an Australian cricketer. He played two first-class matches for New South Wales between 1928/29 and 1929/30.

See also
 List of New South Wales representative cricketers

References

External links
 

1908 births
1954 deaths
Australian cricketers
New South Wales cricketers
Cricketers from Newcastle, New South Wales